Luka Šimunović (born 24 May 1997) is a Croatian professional footballer.

Career

Club
On 22 February 2019, FC Astana announced the signing of Šimunović on a three-year contract from Shakhtyor Soligorsk.

On 9 March 2022, Šimunović returned to Croatia and signed a 2.5-year contract with Šibenik.

Career statistics

Club

References

External links
 

1997 births
Living people
Sportspeople from Livno
Association football central defenders
Croatian footballers
NK Zagreb players
HNK Segesta players
NK Rudeš players
FK Spartaks Jūrmala players
FC Shakhtyor Soligorsk players
FC Astana players
HNK Šibenik players
Croatian Football League players
First Football League (Croatia) players
Latvian Higher League players
Belarusian Premier League players
Kazakhstan Premier League players
Croatian expatriate footballers
Expatriate footballers in Latvia
Expatriate footballers in Belarus
Expatriate footballers in Kazakhstan
Croatian expatriate sportspeople in Latvia
Croatian expatriate sportspeople in Belarus
Croatian expatriate sportspeople in Kazakhstan